The 4 × 400 metres relay at the 1987 World Championships in Athletics was held at the Stadio Olimpico on September 5 and September 6.

Medals

Note: * Indicates athletes who ran in preliminary rounds.

Results
All times shown are in minutes.

Final

Heats

Heat 1

Heat 2

References
IAAF results, heats
IAAF results, final

4 x 400 metres relay women
Relays at the World Athletics Championships
1987 in women's athletics